Janice Bernard (born 30 October 1958) is a Trinidad and Tobago sprinter. She competed in the women's 4 × 100 metres relay at the 1984 Summer Olympics.

References

External links
 

1958 births
Living people
Athletes (track and field) at the 1984 Summer Olympics
Trinidad and Tobago female sprinters
Olympic athletes of Trinidad and Tobago
Athletes (track and field) at the 1975 Pan American Games
Athletes (track and field) at the 1978 Commonwealth Games
Athletes (track and field) at the 1982 Commonwealth Games
Commonwealth Games competitors for Trinidad and Tobago
Athletes (track and field) at the 1983 Pan American Games
Pan American Games silver medalists for Trinidad and Tobago
Pan American Games medalists in athletics (track and field)
Central American and Caribbean Games bronze medalists for Trinidad and Tobago
Central American and Caribbean Games silver medalists for Trinidad and Tobago
Central American and Caribbean Games gold medalists for Trinidad and Tobago
Competitors at the 1978 Central American and Caribbean Games
Competitors at the 1982 Central American and Caribbean Games
Place of birth missing (living people)
Central American and Caribbean Games medalists in athletics
Medalists at the 1983 Pan American Games
Olympic female sprinters